This rather technical article provides a typological sketch of the Pipil language (also known as Nawat). Another related article outlines Pipil grammar in fuller detail. The distinctive purpose of the present article is to single out those specific features of Nawat linguistic structure that are relevant to this language's general typological classification and characterization, answering the question: What major features make this language similar to or different from other languages? Most of the assertions in this article are generalizations from information found in the Pipil grammar article.

This article is likely to be of most interest and use to readers interested in general linguistics, language typology, and related areas such as areal typology, and especially (though not exclusively) to professional linguists. Another possible use of this article is as a thumbnail sketch of the language, a checklist of its most salient points, serving as a brief guide to the fuller language description in the Pipil grammar article.

Phonology

Phoneme inventory
The Nawat phoneme inventory is smaller than that of most languages in the area. Phonemically relevant voice distinctions are generally absent: plosives are normally voiceless (though there exist some voiced allophones), as are fricatives and affricates; liquids, nasals and semivowels are normally voiced (though there exist voiceless allophones).

Other aspects
Syllables consist of a vowel nucleus preceded and followed by a maximum of one consonant: (C)V(C). Word stress is normally phonologically determined, and rarely distinctive.

Morphology
Inflectional and derivational morphology are of moderate complexity, with a fairly balanced mix of prefixing and suffixing mechanisms.

Nominal morphology
In the nominal morphology there is no inflection for case or definiteness, the morphological categories being number, state (absolute vs. construct) and person (of the possessor, with construct state).

Verbal morphology

In the verbal morphology, tense, mood and number (of the subject) are marked by suffixes, person (of the subject, and of the object with transitive verbs) by prefixes. Prefixes can also reduce a transitive verb's argument valency, making it either unaccusative (ta-) or unergative (mu-). A further prefix ((w)al-) adds a directional meaning component (roughly 'towards the speaker') to some verbs, though no longer productively. Derivational suffixes can add to a verb's valency, acting as causatives (which add a new subject as agent) or applicatives (which add a new object as recipient). A few cases of paradigmatic suppletion occur (witz 'comes' :  'came'; ki-uni 'he drinks it (transitive)' : ati 'he drinks (unaccusative)'.

Syntax

Word order

Sentence word order shows considerable flexibility. Pronominal arguments (which may represent subject or object) usually precede the verb, and are only used for emphasis: compare Naja nikita 'I see him/her/it' and Naja nechita 'He/she/it sees me' (naja 'I, me').

Within the noun phrase, determiners and quantifiers precede the head. Adjectives may either precede or follow the head noun. Possessors follow possessed, and relative clauses follow their head. There are prepositional structures.

Head or dependent marking

There is pro-drop for both subject and object (i.e. subject and object pronouns are omitted in unmarked sentences). One or two arguments of the verb are indexed for person and number in the verb (one when intransitive, two when transitive). A maximum of one object index is possible. If a transitive verb has both a patient ('direct object' in English grammar) and a recipient ('indirect object'), it is the latter which is indexed as object of the Nawat verb, e.g. Nechmaka at 'He gives me water', where nech- indexes a first-person-singular object. There is no marking on the arguments to indicate the various semantic relations so far mentioned. This is a head-marking structure, meaning that relations between a head and dependent are marked on the head (here, the verb) and not on the dependent (here, the subject or object). This is also illustrated by the above examples Naja nikita 'I see him' vs. Naja nechita 'He sees me', where the 'case' of the pronoun naja is determined by the indexing on the verb.

Head-marking patterns are found in other parts of Nawat syntax too, so the language shows consistency for this typological feature. The canonical expression of possessive or genitive relations is parallel: the head (i.e. the possessed) is marked with indices indicating the person of the dependent (the possessor), the noun phrase expressing which is either omitted normally if pronominal (a pro-drop phenomenon) or occurs as a noun phrase following the head and unmarked for the possessive relation, e.g. nu-nan 'my mother', i-nan 'his mother', i-nan ne kunet 'the child's mother'.

Argument valency restrictions

Another kind of typological consistency between verbal and nominal constructions is seen in the fact that just as verbs may be classified as intransitives, which do not require an object, and transitives, which require one, so some nouns in Nawat need not have a possessor while others must have one.

Some nouns change their form depending on whether they have a possessor or not, alternating between absolute and construct states, such as absolute kunet, construct  'child'; this is reminiscent of how verbs may change their forms depending on their transitivity (i.e. whether they take an object or not), e.g. intransitive waki, transitive  'dry', transitive miki 'die', transitive -miktia 'kill', etc. Once again, it is changes in the head that determine the nature of the grammatical relation between the head and its dependent(s).

Adpositions

Other relations between a verb and its noun phrase complements or adjuncts are expressed by means of a small number of prepositions or relational constructions. The relational construction itself, e.g. nu-wan 'with me', i-wan 'with him/her/it/', i-wan ne kunet 'with the child', is internally just like possessive constructions, with wan playing the same role as a construct noun.

Predication and sentence types

There is no general copula; instead, a nominal (or other non-verbal) predicate with no verbal component may be made a clause's grammatical nucleus. Some of these take subject indices just like verbal predicates, but tense can only be expressed periphrastically in such sentences.

Negation is achieved by placing a negative particle in front of the predicate. Yes-no questions have no special grammatical marking, while wh-questions are identified by the presence of a question word, which usually precedes the verb (or other predicate).

Subordinate clauses are either introduced by a subordinator in clause-initial position or else are juxtaposed with no subordinating conjunction.

See also

Pipil language
Pipil grammar

Bibliography

 Campbell, Lyle (1985). The Pipil language of El Salvador. Mouton Grammar Library (No. 1). Berlin: Mouton Publishers.  (U.S.), .
 Campbell, Lyle, Terrence Kaufman and Thomas C. Smith-Stark (1986). "Meso-America as a Linguistic Area." Language 62:3, p. 530–570.

Language typology
Indigenous languages of Central America
Mesoamerican languages
Linguistic typology